Go Plastic is the fifth studio album by British electronic musician Squarepusher,  released on Warp in 2001. It peaked at number 100 on the UK Albums Chart.

Production
Unlike many of his earlier albums such as Hard Normal Daddy and Music Is Rotted One Note, which often prominently featured live instrumentation (particularly drums and bass guitar), the sound palette on Go Plastic is almost exclusively synthetic, with an emphasis on high-velocity breakbeats subjected to extensive manipulation and granular effects. In a contemporaneous interview, Squarepusher claimed to be "fed up" with real instruments, wanting everything "brutal and digital."

Despite this, Squarepusher claims that the album was not produced using a computer, but rather by utilizing a range of hardware including the Eventide DSP4000 and Orville digital effects processors, Yamaha QY700 sequencers, Yamaha TX81Z and FS1R synthesizers, and an Akai S6000 sampler.

Critical reception

At Metacritic, which assigns a weighted average score out of 100 to reviews from mainstream critics, Go Plastic received an average score of 70% based on 17 reviews, indicating generally favorable reviews.

In 2015, Exclaim placed it at number 2 on its list of "an essential guide to Squarepusher".

Track listing

Charts

References

External links
 
 

2001 albums
Squarepusher albums
Warp (record label) albums